True Crime: New York City is a 2005 open world action-adventure video game developed by Luxoflux for PlayStation 2, Xbox and GameCube. It was ported to Microsoft Windows by Aspyr, and to mobile by Hands-On Mobile. It was published on all systems by Activision. The PlayStation 2, Xbox and GameCube versions were released in November 2005, the PC version in March 2006, and the mobile version in March 2007. It is the second and final entry in the True Crime franchise, after the 2003 True Crime: Streets of LA.

The game tells the story of Marcus Reed, a former New York City gang member turned police officer. On his first night on the job after receiving a promotion to detective in the Organized Crime Unit, Reed witnesses the death of his mentor. Helped by an FBI agent who is investigating a mole in the OCU, Reed sets about finding out who killed his friend and bringing down the mole. The game features a  recreation of the borough of Manhattan, with most street names, major landmarks and highways reproduced with GPS accuracy.

New York City received mixed reviews from critics and gamers, with critic and gamer reviewers citing numerous technical and graphical glitches, leading many to speculate the final stages of development had been rushed to have the game be released for Christmas. The game also didn't meet Activision's expectations, selling only over 1 million units worldwide across all platforms, much less than Streets of LA. Its mixed reception response and poor sales figures partially contributed to the abandonment of the True Crime franchise. Originally intended as the first of a two-part series set in New York and featuring Marcus Reed, after the game's mixed reception, Activision scrapped the direct sequel and put plans for future True Crime games on hold. In 2007, they hired United Front Games to develop an open world game set in Hong Kong. By 2009, this game had become True Crime: Hong Kong. However, in 2011, the game was canceled. The publishing rights were picked up by Square Enix several months later, and True Crime: Hong Kong was ultimately released as Sleeping Dogs, which has no connection to the True Crime series. In 2014, Activision dropped the True Crime trademark completely.

Gameplay

True Crime is an open world action-adventure game played from a third-person perspective, in which the player controls Detective Marcus Reed of the PDNY. There are four "major cases" in the game; the Magdalena Cartel, the Palermo Mob, the Presidents Club, and the Shadow Tong. When the game begins, only the Magdalena Cartel case is available for play, but once that case has been closed, the player is free to play the remaining three cases in any order they wish.

The game falls into the subgenre of Grand Theft Auto clones as the core gameplay and game mechanics are very similar to 2001's Grand Theft Auto III, 2002's Grand Theft Auto: Vice City, and 2004's Grand Theft Auto: San Andreas. The player can travel across the city freely, commandeer vehicles, do whatever they want in terms of attacking and/or killing innocent civilians, progress through the storyline at their own leisure, spending as much time traversing the city as they wish, and engage in minigames and sidequests. The three main sidequests are a street racing circuit, an underground fight club tournament, and securing confidential informants.

A major difference from previous open world action-adventure video games, including the game's predecessor, True Crime: Streets of LA, is that many buildings throughout the city, beyond those related to the game's story, are accessible to the player. These include pharmacies, where the player can purchase medicine, and delis, where they can purchase food (both of which restore lost health), clothing stores where they can purchase new outfits, car dealers where they can purchase new cars, dojos where they can purchase new fighting techniques, record stores where they can purchase new songs for the game's soundtrack, gun stores where they can purchase new weaponry and ammunition, and other random buildings such as hotels, nightclubs, restaurants, and apartment buildings. Players can also purchase food from hot dog stands. In most business interiors, players can extort the owner for extra cash and/or plant evidence to make an arrest.

Another new addition to the True Crime franchise is the ability for the player to traverse the city not just on foot or by car, but by using public transport. The New York City subway system is available for use, and the player can also hail yellow taxis at any time, requesting transport to any point on the map. Both modes of transportation require a minimal fee.

The main game involves three main types of mission, each with its own unique gameplay; shooting, fighting and driving.

During shooting missions, the game auto-targets the closest opponent. If the player wishes to switch target to another opponent, they must do so manually. When the player is in shooting mode, they can enter "Precision Targeting" at any time. At this point, the game switches to first-person, zooms in on the target, and goes into slow motion momentarily. While in Precision Targeting, if the targeting reticule turns blue, the player can hit the enemy with a neutralizing, non-lethal shot. If the player fires when the reticule is red, the enemy will be killed instantly. Players can also take cover during shootouts, firing from behind cover when the opportunity presents itself. Players are also free to pick up any weapons dropped by enemies. Once the ammo of these weapons is depleted, however, Reed will drop the weapon and revert to his standard issue .38 ACP handgun, which, although it does need to be reloaded, never runs out of ammo.

In hand-to-hand combat, the player has three main attacks; light attack, heavy attack, and grapple. When the player grapples an opponent, they are free to throw them, or hit them with a number of light and/or heavy attacks. At certain points during combat, the enemy will be stunned, and a meter will appear on-screen prompting the player to press either the heavy attack or light attack button as much as possible within a set time. The more times the player presses the button, the more devastating the resulting special attack. The player can also toggle between different fighting styles, and switch to using a melee weapon at any time.

Driving missions can involve either trying to catch another car, or escape from another car. At all times, when the player is in a car, their car's condition is shown on screen. If the car's health meter empties, the car is close to destruction. As with Streets of LA, during normal driving missions, the player can solve random crimes given by the radio dispatcher, although, unlike in the first game, these crimes can now take place inside buildings as well as on the streets. Additionally, the map is divided up into twenty different neighborhoods. When Reed solves a random crime in a particular area, the crime rate in that area drops. After he has solved a set number of crimes in one area, that area is considered "clean," and crime rates will not increase (although random crimes will still occur within the area). If Reed continues to ignore random crimes in a given area before it is clean, the crime rate in that area will increase, leading to stores closing, dirtier streets, boarded up buildings, more aggressive civilians, and resulting in more random crimes needed to clean the area up.

Unlike Streets of LA, where the player could purchase upgrades at the costs of reward points and upon completion of a challenge, upgrades in New York City simply cost money, with no points system and no challenge in place. Upgrades become available for purchase as the player moves up through five grades of promotion. Money in the game can be earned legitimately by collecting wages, or illegitimately by selling evidence at pawn shops and/or extorting business owners.

The player also has a "Good Cop/Bad Cop" meter. If the player arrests criminals, solves crimes, shoots opponents with neutralizing shots, and knocks out rather than kills opponents, they will get Good Cop points. If, however, they kill civilians, kill unarmed criminals, shoot armed criminals in the head, fail to identify themselves as a police officer before opening fire, extort businesses, or sell evidence to pawn stores, they will get Bad Cop points. The player's status as a Good Cop or a Bad Cop will affect the game's ending. If the player performs actions that lead to Bad Cop points, it will also fill a rogue meter and when it gets too high, the player is considered to have "gone rogue," and other police officers will begin to attack Reed.

Plot

The game begins in December 2000, with gangster Marcus Reed (voiced by Avery Waddell) arriving at the home of an associate who has betrayed him. Reed had been placed in charge of the organized crime empire run by his father, Isaiah "The King" Reed (Laurence Fishburne), who has been in prison for fifteen years. As an attempted hit was carried out on Reed in New York, someone stabbed Isaiah in jail. However, both father and son survived, and Reed now kills everyone who betrayed him. PDNY detective Terry Higgins (Mickey Rourke) then arrives on the scene. He is a close friend of Isaiah, and Reed's godfather, and he offers to cover up the killings, on the condition that Reed gets his life together.

Five years later, Reed is now a NYPD officer, working as a beat cop under the command of Lt. Deena Dixon (Mariska Hargitay). However, he has applied for and been accepted into the Organized Crime Unit run by Chief Victor Navarro (Esai Morales), where he is partnered with Higgins. On Reed's first night, Higgins heads for a meeting at a warehouse, telling Reed he doesn't need to know the details. Moments after Higgins enters the building, it explodes, killing Higgins. In the aftermath, Navarro returns Reed to Dixon's command. She tells him he can keep his recently earned promotion and work plainclothes, but is not to investigate Higgins' death, as Navarro wants the investigation to remain internal to OCU. Shortly thereafter, Reed is contacted by FBI Special Agent Gabriel Whitting (Christopher Walken), who informs him there is a mole in the OCU. Whitting believes Higgins was about to reveal the identity of the mole, which is why he was killed. Prior to his death, Higgins told Whitting to bring Reed into the investigation should anything happen. All Whitting knows about the mole is that they are in contact with four major crime organizations in Manhattan.

Reed's first investigation is the Magdalena Cartel, believed to be responsible for 75% of New York's cocaine trade. Higgins had made contact with socialite and philanthropist Teresa Castillo (Socorro Santiago), who he believed may be able to help him get inside the cartel. She gives Reed information leading him to the Magdalena safe house, where he chases down their leader, Rey (Paolo Andino). However, Rey turns out to be head of the Latin Lords, the main rival of the Magdalena Cartel; the Cartel was using Reed to take out their competition. Reed discovers Teresa's real name is Magdalena Rojas, and she runs the cartel. He arrests her, but she tells him she doesn't know who the mole is, only that as their information was always accurate, she knows it is someone high up in the OCU.

Reed next goes after the Palermo Mob. Whitting tells him that when the last Don was imprisoned in 1995, the mob went into decline. Recently, however, the remnants have begun to organize. Whitting believes a new Don has emerged, but is unsure who it may be. After taking down the mob's lucrative illegal organ operation and interrogating the new don's right-hand man Alfie, Reed is led to the family's don, Vincent Tuzzi (Fred Berman). When Reed interrogates him, he says he never met the OCU mole; all their business was conducted over the phone. All Tuzzi knows is that he has a Spanish accent.

Reed next investigates the Presidents Club; a gang run by five men using pseudonyms of former Presidents of the United States. They control the supply of a new drug called "Pop", a combination of ecstasy and cocaine. Four of the leaders call themselves Lincoln, Hamilton, Jackson and Grant. The overall leader is called Benjamin, who takes ironic pride in the fact that Benjamin Franklin was never President. Whitting sends Reed to a drug den in Harlem run by Lincoln (Phil Morris). Lincoln leads Reed to Hamilton (Richard Yearwood), who tells him the Yakuza have declared war on the Presidents, and Jackson is on his way to kill the Yakuza's leader, Kobi (Jeanne Mori). Reed saves Kobi from a drive-by shooting, and kills Jackson. Kobi tells him Benjamin's real name is Lionel Jones (Cornell Womack), a famed rapper and music producer. Reed heads to Jones' factory, arriving in time to see Kobi's men killed by Grant (Greg Eagles). Grant leads Reed to Jones' building, where Reed fights through Jones' men to his zen garden on the roof, seeing him kill Kobi. He interrogates Jones, who tells him he doesn't know who the mole in the OCU is, except that he calls himself "El Jefe."

Reed next goes after the Shadow Tong, a Triad outfit run by Leeland Shen (Jerry Ying). Whitting has only one way for Reed to make contact with Leeland; his step-sister, Vivian (Jennifer Chu) recently ran away, and Shen has been unable to find her. Witting tells Reed where she is, and Reed returns her to Leeland, pretending he wants to cut a deal for The King to distribute Leeland's merchandise in Harlem. Leeland puts Reed in contact with Lin (James Hong), who handles local distribution. However, Leeland discovers Reed is an undercover cop and orders Lin to kill him. Reed survives, and based on the information Lin has given him, goes to a Chinese dock ship where their human smuggling operation takes place. After he takes down the captain of the ship and interrogates him, Reed heads to Leeland's headquarters, where Leeland tells him he doesn't know who the mole is, but he does know a bribe is set to be picked up at a locker in Grand Central Station.

Reed calls Whitting, telling him he believes Navarro is the mole, and asking for a search warrant for the locker. Inside, they find the money, although Navarro claims he has been set up. In the good ending, Whitting arrests him, and, thinking the case closed, Reed heads home. However, in the subway, he is approached by Higgins. Reed immediately realizes Higgins was the mole all along; he knew Whitting was getting close to him so he faked his own death and then set up Navarro to take the fall. Higgins asks Reed to join him, offering him a bribe and threatens to expose his role in the massacre 5 years ago, but Reed refuses. He pursues Higgins through a subway car, eventually killing him. As a reward for Reed's work, Whitting promises to pull some strings to get Isaiah a hearing with the DA.

In the bad ending, Navarro kills Whitting when he tries to arrest him, and Reed pursues him into the subway, killing him. As Reed heads home, he is approached by Higgins. Reed is unsurprised, having realized Higgins had faked his own death. Higgins asks Reed to join him in Mexico, but Reed kills him. The game ends with Reed sitting in the subway station contemplating what to do with Higgins' money.

Development
The game was first announced on July 21, 2004, when Activision CEO Ron Doornink announced plans for "sequels to True Crime, Call of Duty, Spider-Man, Tony Hawk, Shrek, and Quake." However, nothing more was heard about the game for almost a year; until May 2005, when Activision revealed that the game was so big, developers Luxoflux had drafted in staff from another Activision owned developer, Z-Axis. The game, under the provisional title True Crime 2, was unofficially scheduled for a third quarter release, and was expected to be unveiled at the upcoming E3 event. Doornink stated "In the third quarter, we plan to release our strongest and most diverse lineup ever--specifically, brand-new games for Tony Hawk, Call of Duty, X-Men, True Crime, Quake, and Shrek. Each of these franchises is targeted at a different consumer."

On May 18, Activision debuted a trailer for the game. The trailer revealed nothing about the plot or the location, but simply featured Marcus Reed arresting some criminals. Attached to the trailer was a competition called "True Crime: Guess the City and Win Marcus' Ride." Players were encouraged to go to the game's official website and guess in which city they think the game is set. The competition's winner would win a Chrysler 300, Reed's car when the game begins. At the E3 event, Activision dedicated a large part of their booth to the upcoming game, but no footage was made available, nor was any plot information, or even a title, with the game now going by True Crime 2005. The Chrysler available in the competition was present, as were DJs playing songs which would be featured in the game. All that was confirmed at E3 was that the game would definitely be released on current generation systems.

On June 22, 2005, True Crimes official website revealed the game would take place in New York City, with an image of the Manhattan skyline appearing as the site's wallpaper. In August, IGN published an interview with former NYPD detective Bill Clark, who had previously served as executive producer and technical advisor of NYPD Blue, and was now working as head technical advisor for True Crime: New York City. Clarke has been with the NYPD for twenty-five years, seventeen in homicide. During his time on the force, he was involved in such major cases as the Son of Sam investigation, and the collapse of several of the "Five Families". Of his involvement with the game, Clarke stated

In his efforts to help Activision make the best game they could, Clarke found a compromise had to be reached between reality and the nature of videogaming;

A work-in-progress build of the game was first shown on September 7. Activision revealed the basic plot and announced the branching storyline system from Streets of LA was not being used. Instead, when the player fails a mission, they would simply be given the option to replay it, meaning story content wouldn't be missed. They also announced several features new to the game, including a continuous day/night cycle, a more populated city than Los Angeles in Streets of LA, a much darker palette than the first game, more cars and vehicles, the ability to travel by taxi or subway, and the ability to enter buildings beyond those related to plot. They also explained the precinct component of the game; if the player ignores random crimes in particular areas, shops will begin to close down, the city streets will become dirtier and buildings will be boarded up. It was also revealed the playing area would be .

The following week, the main voice cast was announced, including Laurence Fishburne, Mickey Rourke, Christopher Walken, Mariska Hargitay, Esai Morales, and Traci Lords. Marcus Reed would be voiced by Avery Waddell. Details of the soundtrack were released a week later. The soundtrack's headliner was Redman, who was recording an original song for the game, and would also be an unlocakble character with his own minigame, much as Snoop Dogg had in Streets of LA. Tim Riley, worldwide executive of music at Activision, stated "As an East Coast artist who paid his dues performing in the clubs of New York City, Redman's inspired rhymes bring the gritty realism of the city to life in our game. His bold lyrics and hard-edged funk beats capture the vibes of the city, from Washington Heights to Harlem and all the way down to Battery Park." Activision also announced that although the game had only one original song, it would feature over eighty licensed tracks from artists such as Jay Z, Fat Joe, A Tribe Called Quest, The Ramones, The Velvet Underground, My Chemical Romance, The Bravery, and Bob Dylan.

As part of the video game's launch, PUMA announced a unique sneaker mission within the game, and the production of a special edition sneaker. In the game, if players find all of the True Crime RS-100 sneakers throughout the city and return them to real New York City retailers featured in the game, the player unlocks an exclusive PUMA outfit for Reed. In addition, players could purchase the limited-edition True Crime RS-100 sneakers within the same New York City stores in the real world.

NYPD controversy
On September 26, 2005, Raymond Kelly (New York City Police Commissioner) and Patrick Lynch (president of the Patrolmen's Benevolent Association of the City of New York) called for a boycott of the game, citing its depiction of law-breaking police officers as damaging and offensive. In an interview with the New York Daily News, Kelly stated "It's an outrage. I think it disrespects all police officers." Although the game was made in conjunction with two former NYPD detectives, Bill Clarke and Tom Walker (author of Fort Apache: The Bronx), and although the police force in the game is called the PDNY (as opposed to the real life NYPD), Kelly stated "It's totally inappropriate. It's a tough job, a dangerous job, and this undermines what police officers try to do. I'm saddened that some former members of the department are linked to that video game." Lynch said of Clarke, "The cop who worked on this video should look in the mirror. He makes it harder for everyone working the job." Clark responded by commenting that police unions "should stop worrying about video games and spend more time getting cops more than a $25,000 starting salary."

Reception

True Crime: New York City received "mixed or average reviews" across all systems; the PlayStation 2 version holds an aggregate score of 60 out of 100 on Metacritic, based on forty-seven reviews; the Xbox version 60 out of 100, based on forty-three reviews, the GameCube version 59 out of 100, based on twenty-five reviews; and the PC version 54 out of 100, based on twelve reviews.

IGN's Chris Roper scored the console versions 7.8 out of 10, praising "how well your general duties as a cop are tied into the game, working very well alongside your own personal investigations," and finding the gameplay and game mechanics superior to Streets of LA. His main criticism was "it doesn't really take any risks [...] it doesn't feel like it's an altogether new gaming experience." However, he wrote "True Crimes strengths lie in the solid ways that everything is put together." He concluded "it's a solid title through and through, but you won't find a whole lot of water cooler moments in there [...] If you're tired of the whole GTA thing and want more substance, this may not be the game for you. For everyone else though, TC: NYC is definitely worth checking out." He scored the PC version 6.5 out of 10, and was critical of Aspyr's work on the port; "it seems the company did little more than get the game up and running on the PC and didn't bother to fine-tune a few of the controls for the system." He was highly critical of the graphics; "Pop-up is a major problem [...] LOD on characters is also pretty screwy, with entirely mis-matched low-res models filling in for some characters [...] shadows and such pop in and out of view, camera movement during cutscenes would cut at odd times or display the wrong angle for a split second, etc. etc. It simply feels unpolished."

Eurogamer's Jim Rossignol scored the PlayStation 2 version 6 out of 10, writing "True Crime trips over its own inflated Nikes with just a few too many moments of lamentable emptiness." He was critical of the AI; "The perps you take down never suggest that they are anything other than mindless automata ready to be slain, and exhibit an artificiality that could never be described as 'intelligence'." He also compared the game unfavorably to Grand Theft Auto: San Andreas; "while artistically more accomplished, New York City lacks the personality of the big daddy. And there is little in the way of humour."

GameSpy's Sterling McGarvey scored the PlayStation 2 version 2.5 out of 5, writing Luxoflux have "turned a slightly above-par GTA clone into a sub-par franchise." He was critical of the recreation of New York; "textures look rather drab and plain, and the draw distance looks blurry and uninteresting [...] it really feels as though the development team failed to capture one of New York's most distinctive traits: the raw humanity of it all." Of the graphics, he wrote, "the frame rate has a knack for chugging. Considering it's a console and not a five year-old PC running this game, it's unacceptable. Out of nowhere, the frame rate will completely bottom out while Marcus patrols the streets." He concluded by criticizing the game for being unfinished, arguing anyone who buys it will "have dropped their hard-earned money to beta test a truly unfinished game."

GameSpot's Greg Mueller was extremely unimpressed, scoring the GameCube and PlayStation 2 versions 4.6 out of 10, and the Xbox version 4.3 out of 10. He accused the game of being "so riddled with problems that it feels like it was rushed to make it to store shelves in time for the holidays." He cited "bugs that will make you randomly fall through the ground into a bunch of nothingness, bugs that make textures change when you get in and out of a car, bugs that cause you to inadvertently break a scripted sequence, thus making it impossible to complete a mission. There are also collision detection issues and edge detection problems that cause you to get stuck on the edge of a platform. That's not all--the game will actually freeze up entirely from time to time [...] There are also some pretty ugly clipping issues here too." He concluded "True Crime: New York City should be avoided regardless of whether or not you enjoyed the first True Crime. The gameplay has a few almost-decent spots, but the technical problems far outweigh any faint hope this game ever had of being enjoyable. If you're curious about what a video game looks like before it goes through adequate testing and quality assurance, then by all means give this one a try." He scored the PC version 5.2 out of 10, writing, "while it manages to address some of the more egregious glitches that appeared in the console versions of the game, it still doesn't feel like a finished product."

Sales and awards
True Crime: New York City did not sell well, falling considerably short of Activision's expectations. In North America, True Crime: Streets of LA sold over 300,000 units across all platforms in its first week. By the end of its first month, it had sold over 600,000 units. Ultimately, it went on to sell over 3 million units worldwide across all platforms. By contrast, New York City sold only 72,000 units in its first two weeks, earning only $3.6 million.

At the 2005 Spike Video Game Awards, True Crime was nominated for four awards; "Cyber Vixen of the Year" (Traci Lords as Cassandra Hartz), "Best Supporting Male Performance" (Christopher Walken as Gabrial Whitting), and two "Best Supporting Female" nominations (Traci Lords as Cassandra Hartz and Mariska Hargitay as Deena Dixon). It won "Best Supporting Male Performance" and Lords won "Best Supporting Female Performance." Cyber Vixen of the Year was won by Maria Menounos as Eva in James Bond 007: From Russia with Love.

Cancelled sequels
True Crime: New York City was originally intended to have been the first part of a two-part series set in New York and featuring Marcus Reed, but the second part was never made.

Due to the game's critical and commercial failure, Activision dropped plans for any future True Crime games. However, towards the end of 2007, they approached United Front Games to develop an open world game for next generation consoles set in Hong Kong, and unrelated to the True Crime series. Originally called Black Lotus, the game went into production in early 2008. A year into development, Activision proposed that Black Lotus be incorporated into the True Crime  franchise, due to the similarities in their designs and plots; all three games were set in open worlds with narratives centered on an undercover cop in a criminal organization. Activision hoped the new ideas brought to the table by United Front could help revitalize the True Crime franchise. At the 2009 Spike Video Game Awards, Activision debuted the game as True Crime: Hong Kong. Although originally slated for a Fall 2010 release, in May 2010, Activision announced the game had been pushed back to early 2011 "in order to give the development team more time to deliver the high-quality entertainment experience they envision for the game."

In February 2011, however, Activision cancelled True Crime: Hong Kong, claiming that due to "quality issues," further investment would not make the game competitive in the open world genre. United Front executive producer Stephen Van Der Mescht expressed disappointment with Activision's decision, stating the game was "playable from start to finish and virtually complete in terms of content." In June, Activision CEO Eric Hirshberg explained that an escalating budget and development delays were the main contributing factors in the game's cancellation. Hirshberg stated that the increase in budget and subsequent delays meant the game would have to be "a pretty incredible success in order to be worth the investment that it was taking to get it done." Due to competition posed by other titles, particularly Grand Theft Auto and Red Dead Redemption, and the fact that the previous game in the True Crime series had been a critical and commercial failure, Activision's view was that the game would not be able to compete.

However, in August, Square Enix acquired the publishing rights to the game, although they did not buy the rights to the True Crime franchise, which were retained by Activision. Ultimately, the game was renamed Sleeping Dogs and released in August 2012. In December 2014, Activision abandoned the True Crime trademark completely.

References

External links 

2005 video games
Action-adventure games
Activision games
Aspyr games
Detective video games
Federal Bureau of Investigation in fiction
Fictional portrayals of the New York City Police Department
GameCube games
Luxoflux games
Mobile games
Open-world video games
Organized crime video games
PlayStation 2 games
Police misconduct in fiction
Single-player video games
Third-person shooters
Video games about police officers
Video games about the illegal drug trade
Video games featuring black protagonists
Video games scored by Sean Murray
Video games set in 2000
Video games set in 2005
Video games set in New York City
Video games with alternate endings
Windows games
Xbox games
Video games developed in the United States